Ivan Dmitriyevich Ivanchenko (born 7 September 1998) is a Russian football player. He plays as a midfielder for FC Kolomna.

Club career
He made his debut in the Russian Professional Football League for FC Lada-Togliatti on 3 September 2015 in a game against FC Volga Ulyanovsk.

He made his Russian Premier League debut for FC Anzhi Makhachkala on 26 November 2017 in a game against FC Rostov.

Career statistics

Club

References

External links
 Profile by Russian Professional Football League

1998 births
Sportspeople from Perm, Russia
Living people
Russian footballers
FC Lada-Tolyatti players
FC Anzhi Makhachkala players
Russian Premier League players
FC Zenit-2 Saint Petersburg players
Association football forwards
FC Amkar Perm players
FC Armavir players
FC Zvezda Perm players